Northern Lights – Southern Cross is the sixth studio album by Canadian-American rock group the Band, released in 1975. It was the first album to be recorded at their new California studio, Shangri-La, and the first album of all new material since 1971's Cahoots. All eight songs are credited as compositions of guitarist Robbie Robertson.

Northern Lights – Southern Cross was recorded using a 24-track tape recorder, which allowed Garth Hudson to include multiple layers of keyboards on several tracks.

Three songs from the album – "It Makes No Difference", "Ophelia" and "Acadian Driftwood" – were performed at The Last Waltz, the Band's 1976 "final performance".  "It Makes No Difference" and "Ophelia" were included in the Last Waltz film and on the original 1978 soundtrack album, and "Acadian Driftwood" was included in the 2002 extended re-release of the soundtrack album.  These songs in particular have enjoyed subsequent revivals and cover versions. "Acadian Driftwood" was featured in a 1984 CBC-TV special titled Murray McLauchlan's Floating Over Canada. The only Band member to appear in the sequence was Levon Helm. In this presentation of the song, Levon, his wife Sandy Helm, and Murray McLauchlan depict the expulsion of Acadian citizens by British forces.

The album was well-received critically: Rolling Stone declared that The Band had kicked "a field goal", and, while he was put off by the sentimentality of the lyrics, Robert Christgau wrote "the pure comeliness of every melody on this album led to an immediate infatuation." John Bauldie in Q Magazine called the album "glossy and slick" and lamented that the close-knit aspect of the group playing together had disappeared.

Track listing
All songs written and composed by Robbie Robertson.

Side one

Side two

 Sides one and two were combined as tracks 1–8 on CD reissues.

Bonus track listing from 2001 re-release

Personnel
The Band 
Rick Danko – bass, guitar, violin, harmonica, vocals, mixing
Levon Helm – drums, guitar, percussion, vocals
Garth Hudson – organ, keyboards, accordion, saxophones, synthesizers, piccolo, brass, woodwind, chanter, bass, mixing
Richard Manuel – acoustic and electric piano, keyboards, organ, drums, clavinet, percussion, vocals
Robbie Robertson – guitars, piano, clavinet, melodica, percussion, mixing

Additional personnel
Byron Berline – fiddle on "Acadian Driftwood"
Nat Jeffrey – engineer, mixing
Rob Fraboni – engineer, mixing
Ed Anderson – engineer

Charts
Album - Billboard (United States)

Singles - Billboard (United States)

External links

 – Peter Viney's article on "Acadian Driftwood" at theband.hiof.no
 – Peter Viney's article on "Jupiter Hollow" at theband.hiof.no

References

The Band albums
1975 albums
Capitol Records albums
Albums produced by Garth Hudson
Albums produced by Levon Helm
Albums produced by Richard Manuel
Albums produced by Rick Danko
Albums produced by Robbie Robertson
Albums recorded at Shangri-La (recording studio)